Adam Phillips (born 19 September 1954) is a British psychoanalytic  psychotherapist and essayist.

Since 2003 he has been the general editor of the new Penguin Modern Classics translations of Sigmund Freud. He is also a regular contributor to the London Review of Books.

Joan Acocella, writing in The New Yorker, described Phillips as "Britain's foremost psychoanalytic writer", an opinion echoed by historian Élisabeth Roudinesco in Le Monde.

Life
Phillips was born in Cardiff, Wales, in 1954, the child of second-generation Polish Jews. He grew up as part of an extended family of aunts, uncles and cousins and describes his parents as "very consciously Jewish but not believing". As a child, his first interest was the study of tropical birds and it was not until adolescence that he developed an interest in literature. He was educated at Clifton College.

He went on to study English at St John's College, Oxford, graduating with a third class degree. His defining influences are literary; he was inspired to become a psychoanalyst after reading Carl Jung's autobiography and he has always believed psychoanalysis to be closer to poetry than medicine: "For me, psychoanalysis has always been of a piece with the various languages of literature—a kind of practical poetry." He began his training soon after leaving Oxford, underwent four years of analysis with Masud Khan and qualified to practice at the age of 27. He had a particular interest in children and began working as a child psychotherapist: "one of the pleasures of child psychotherapy is that it is, as it were, psychoanalysis for a non-psychoanalytic audience."

From 1990 to 1997, he was principal child psychotherapist at Charing Cross Hospital in London. Phillips worked in the National Health Service for seventeen years, but became disillusioned with its tightening bureaucratic demands. He currently divides his time between writing and his private practice in Notting Hill. For a number of years, he was in a relationship with the academic Jacqueline Rose. He has been a visiting professor at the University of York English department since 2006.

Literary presence
Phillips is a regular contributor to the London Review of Books. He has been described by The Times as "the Martin Amis of British psychoanalysis" for his "brilliantly amusing and often profoundly unsettling" work, and by John Banville as "one of the finest prose stylists in the language, an Emerson of our time." His approach to the new Freud edition is consistent with his own ideas about psychoanalysis, which he considers to be a form of rhetorical persuasion. He has published essays on a variety of themes, including the work of literary figures such as Charles Lamb, Walter Savage Landor and William Empson, as well as on philosophy and psychoanalysis; he has also written Winnicott in the Fontana Modern Masters series.

He is deeply opposed to any attempt to defend psychoanalysis as a science or even as a field of academic study, rather than simply, as he puts it, "a set of stories about how we can nourish ourselves to keep faith with our belief in nourishment, our desire for desire"—"stories [that] will sustain our appetite, which is, by definition, our appetite for life." His influences include D.W. Winnicott, Roland Barthes, Stanley Cavell and W.H. Auden.

Assessment
Phillips has been described as "perhaps the best theorist of the modes and malfunctions of modernist psychology". For his intellectual resources, Phillips "draws from philosophy, literature, politics amongst others. However, whilst this affords Phillips the opportunity to be expansive it also makes him a maverick", and others "suspicious of his work", so that he has been called "ludic and elusive and intellectually slippery." Indeed, "To his critics ... Phillips is little more than a charlatan about whom an alarming cult of personality is developing." He himself was opposed to "the idealization that is a refusal to know someone", and even in appraisal of the psychoanalytic greats thought that alongside "thoughtful consideration ... puerile consideration would not be the end of the world", in accordance with his enduring scepticism "about psychoanalysis ... it should be the opposite, the antidote to a cult."

On psychoanalysis
Phillips constantly refuses to "claim" any particular patch of psychoanalytic territory or even defend the value of psychoanalysis itself. "For me", he has said, "psychoanalysis is only one among many things you might do if you're feeling unwell—you might also try aromatherapy, knitting, hang-gliding. There are lots of things you can do with your distress. I don't believe psychoanalysis is the best thing you can do, even if I value it a great deal." He has also been alert to the possibility that "psychoanalysis ... disempowers in the name of knowing what's best ... at its worst it forces a pattern.  It can make the links that should have been left to find their own way." In the end, he claims, "Psychoanalysis cannot enable the patient to know what he wants, but only to risk finding out." 

On psychoanalysis and science he says, "I don't think psychoanalysts should have bought into the scientific model with such eagerness. I don't think psychoanalysis is a science or should aspire to be one."

Works

Further reading

See also
 Christopher Bollas
 Jacqueline Rose
 Joseph J. Sandler

References

External links
 Review of The Beast in the Nursery at Complete review  *Discussion with Adam Phillips about Monogamy
 Profile in the New Statesman
 Audio: Adam Phillips in conversation on the BBC World Service discussion show The Forum
 Fisun Gunar Q&A:Adam Phillips 17.4.2010
 Audio, transcript of 2009 interview with British journalist Jennifer O'Mahony
 Audio of interview with Leonard Lopate on WNYC radio on February 26, 2013

1954 births
British essayists
British non-fiction writers
Fellows of the Royal Society of Literature
Child psychologists
Living people
People educated at Clifton College
Alumni of St John's College, Oxford
Analysands of Masud Khan
People from Cardiff
British people of Polish-Jewish descent
British male essayists